Ewa Walawska (born 1943) is a Polish printmaker.

From 1995 until 2000 she taught at the European Academy of Arts in Warsaw. Walawska received the Medal for Merit to Culture – Gloria Artis in 2013. Her work has been featured in numerous international exhibitions, and she is represented in the collection of the National Gallery of Art.

References

1943 births
Living people
20th-century Polish women artists
21st-century Polish women artists
20th-century printmakers
21st-century printmakers
Polish printmakers
Women printmakers
Artists from Warsaw
Academy of Fine Arts in Warsaw alumni
Academic staff of the Academy of Fine Arts in Warsaw
Recipients of the Medal for Merit to Culture – Gloria Artis